The arrondissement of Saint-Étienne is located in the Loire department in the Auvergne-Rhône-Alpes region of France. It has 75 communes.

Composition

The communes of the arrondissement of Saint-Étienne, and their INSEE codes, are:

 Andrézieux-Bouthéon (42005)
 Le Bessat (42017)
 Bessey (42018)
 Bourg-Argental (42023)
 Burdignes (42028)
 Çaloire (42031)
 Cellieu (42032)
 Chagnon (42036)
 Le Chambon-Feugerolles (42044)
 La Chapelle-Villars (42051)
 Châteauneuf (42053)
 Chavanay (42056)
 Chuyer (42064)
 Colombier (42067)
 Dargoire (42083)
 Doizieux (42085)
 L'Étrat (42092)
 Farnay (42093)
 Firminy (42095)
 Fontanès (42096)
 La Fouillouse (42097)
 Fraisses (42099)
 Genilac (42225)
 Graix (42101)
 La Grand-Croix (42103)
 L'Horme (42110)
 Jonzieux (42115)
 Lorette (42123)
 Lupé (42124)
 Maclas (42129)
 Malleval (42132)
 Marcenod (42133)
 Marlhes (42139)
 Pavezin (42167)
 Pélussin (42168)
 Planfoy (42172)
 La Ricamarie (42183)
 Rive-de-Gier (42186)
 Roche-la-Molière (42189)
 Roisey (42191)
 Saint-Appolinard (42201)
 Saint-Chamond (42207)
 Saint-Christo-en-Jarez (42208)
 Sainte-Croix-en-Jarez (42210)
 Saint-Étienne (42218)
 Saint-Genest-Lerpt (42223)
 Saint-Genest-Malifaux (42224)
 Saint-Héand (42234)
 Saint-Jean-Bonnefonds (42237)
 Saint-Joseph (42242)
 Saint-Julien-Molin-Molette (42246)
 Saint-Martin-la-Plaine (42259)
 Saint-Michel-sur-Rhône (42265)
 Saint-Paul-en-Cornillon (42270)
 Saint-Paul-en-Jarez (42271)
 Saint-Pierre-de-Bœuf (42272)
 Saint-Priest-en-Jarez (42275)
 Saint-Régis-du-Coin (42280)
 Saint-Romain-en-Jarez (42283)
 Saint-Romain-les-Atheux (42286)
 Saint-Sauveur-en-Rue (42287) 
 Sorbiers (42302)
 La Talaudière (42305)
 Tarentaise (42306)
 Tartaras (42307)
 La Terrasse-sur-Dorlay (42308)
 Thélis-la-Combe (42310)
 La Tour-en-Jarez (42311)
 Unieux (42316)
 La Valla-en-Gier (42322)
 Valfleury (42320)
 Véranne (42326)
 Vérin (42327)
 La Versanne (42329)
 Villars (42330)

History

The arrondissement of Saint-Étienne was created in 1800. In January 2017 it gained the commune Andrézieux-Bouthéon from the arrondissement of Montbrison.

As a result of the reorganisation of the cantons of France which came into effect in 2015, the borders of the cantons are no longer related to the borders of the arrondissements. The cantons of the arrondissement of Saint-Étienne were, as of January 2015:

 Bourg-Argental
 Firminy
 La Grand-Croix
 Le Chambon-Feugerolles
 Pélussin
 Rive-de-Gier
 Saint-Chamond-Nord
 Saint-Chamond-Sud
 Saint-Étienne-Nord-Est-1
 Saint-Étienne-Nord-Est-2
 Saint-Étienne-Nord-Ouest-1
 Saint-Étienne-Nord-Ouest-2
 Saint-Étienne-Sud-Est-1
 Saint-Étienne-Sud-Est-2
 Saint-Étienne-Sud-Est-3
 Saint-Étienne-Sud-Ouest-1
 Saint-Étienne-Sud-Ouest-2
 Saint-Genest-Malifaux
 Saint-Héand

References

Saint-Etienne